Rufus Wade Fox Jr. (June 2, 1920 – September 20, 1964), was an American zoologist and herpetologist from the University of California, Berkeley. He specialized in the anatomy of snakes and the systematics of the western garter snakes.

Biography
Wade Fox was born on June 2, 1920 in Hilton, Virginia.

He graduated from the University of North Carolina in 1943 and then earned a Master's (1946) and doctoral degree at the University of California, Berkeley, working as  Curatorial Assistant of in the Museum of Vertebrate Zoology from 1943–1949, and earning a PhD under Robert C. Stebbins in 1950. His dissertation topic was "Biology of the Garter Snakes of the San Francisco Bay Region". Later he became president of Herpetologists' League and an editor of the journal Copeia.

He named several garter snake (Thamnophis) subspecies, including Thamnophis elegans terrestris, Thamnophis elegans aquaticus (now a synonym of T. atratus atratus) and Thamnophis sirtalis fitchi. He is commemorated in the name of the Fox's mountain meadow snake (Adelophis foxi ).

Wade Fox died of a heart attack following heart surgery on September 20, 1964.

Partial bibliography

References

American herpetologists
1920 births
1964 deaths
University of Southern California faculty
University of California, Berkeley alumni
University of North Carolina alumni
Louisiana State University faculty
People from Scott County, Virginia
Scientists from California
Scientists from Virginia
20th-century American zoologists